Mokhtar Kandi may refer to:
 Mokhtar Kandi, Chaldoran
 Mokhtar Kandi, Maku